Jardines del Hipódromo is a barrio (neighbourhood or district) of Montevideo, Uruguay.

Educational facilities
 Colegio y Liceo Beata Imelda, Camino Maldonado 5853 (private, Roman Catholic, Dominican Sisters of the Annunciation of the Blessed Virgin)

Places of worship
 Parish Church of the Most Holy Trinity and the Holy Family, Camino Maldonado 5842 (Roman Catholic, Dominicans)
 Mater Admirabilis Parish Church, Av. Dr. Carlos Nery 3626 (Roman Catholic)

See also 
Barrios of Montevideo

References

Barrios of Montevideo